USS Seaward (IX-60) was a schooner of the United States Navy during World War II. The ship was built by the Adams Company, East Boothbay, Maine, in 1920. She was acquired by the Navy on 31 January 1942 from Cecil B. DeMille Productions, Los Angeles, California.

Service history
The auxiliary schooner was placed in service on 19 February 1942, assigned to the 11th Naval District, and homeported at San Pedro, California. On 23 July, Seaward was assigned to the Western Sea Frontier.

Seaward ended the year at Mare Island Navy Yard. She was placed out of service on 1 April 1943, and was struck from the Navy List on 18 July 1944.

References

External links
 The Seaward
 Photo gallery at navsource.org

Unclassified miscellaneous vessels of the United States Navy
Ships built in Boothbay, Maine
1920 ships